MLR Institute Of Technology is an engineering college located in Dundigal, Hyderabad, India.  It was founded in 2005, and is affiliated with the Jawaharlal Nehru Technological University, Hyderabad.

References

External links
 

Engineering colleges in Hyderabad, India
2005 establishments in Andhra Pradesh
Educational institutions established in 2005